The 77th Golden Globe Awards honored the best in film and American television of 2019, as chosen by the Hollywood Foreign Press Association. Produced by Dick Clark Productions and the HFPA, the ceremony was broadcast live on January 5, 2020, from The Beverly Hilton in Beverly Hills, California beginning at 5:00 p.m. PST / 8:00 p.m. EST. The ceremony aired live on NBC in the United States. Ricky Gervais hosted the ceremony for the fifth and "final" time.

The nominees were announced on December 9, 2019, by Tim Allen, Dakota Fanning and Susan Kelechi Watson. Marriage Story earned a leading six nominations. Tom Hanks and Ellen DeGeneres were announced as the recipients of the Cecil B. DeMille Award and the Carol Burnett Award, respectively.

Once Upon a Time in Hollywood won the most awards for the ceremony with three, including Best Motion Picture – Musical or Comedy. 1917, Joker, and Rocketman won two awards each, with 1917 winning Best Motion Picture – Drama. In television, Succession, Fleabag and Chernobyl were the most awarded, with two awards each.

The ceremony was nominated for two Primetime Emmy Awards: Outstanding Variety Special (Live) and Outstanding Production Design for a Variety Special.

Winners and nominees

Film

Films with multiple nominations
The following films received multiple nominations:

Films with multiple wins
The following films received multiple wins:

Television

Series with multiple nominations
The following television series received multiple nominations:

Series with multiple wins
The following three series received multiple wins:

Cecil B. DeMille Award
The Cecil B. DeMille Award is an honorary award bestowed for outstanding contributions to the world of entertainment. It is awarded to honorees who have made a significant mark in the film industry and is named after its first recipient, director Cecil B. DeMille.

 Tom Hanks

Carol Burnett Award
The Carol Burnett Award is an honorary award given for outstanding and lasting contributions to television on or off the screen. It is named in honor of its first recipient, actress Carol Burnett.

 Ellen DeGeneres

Ceremony

Golden Globe Ambassadors
The Golden Globe Ambassadors are Dylan Brosnan and Paris Brosnan, sons of Pierce Brosnan and Keely Shaye Smith.

Presenters
The following individuals presented awards at the ceremony:
 Jennifer Aniston and Reese Witherspoon with Best Actor – Television Series Musical or Comedy and Best Actor – Miniseries or Television Film
 Annette Bening introduced 1917
 Elton John and Bernie Taupin introduced Rocketman
 Matt Bomer and Sofía Vergara with Best Supporting Actor – Series, Miniseries or Television Film and Best Television Series – Drama
 Harvey Keitel introduced The Irishman
 Ted Danson and Kerry Washington with Best Actress – Television Series Musical or Comedy
 Kit Harington and Sienna Miller with Best Foreign Language Film
 Kate McKinnon with the Carol Burnett Award
 Daniel Craig and Ana de Armas introduced Knives Out
 Tim Allen and Lauren Graham with Best Actor – Television Series Drama
 Ewan McGregor and Margot Robbie with Best Screenplay
 Amy Poehler and Taylor Swift with Best Animated Feature Film
 Leonardo DiCaprio and Brad Pitt introduced Once Upon a Time in Hollywood
 Gwyneth Paltrow with Best Supporting Actress – Motion Picture
 Priyanka Chopra and Nick Jonas with Best Television Series – Musical or Comedy
 Ansel Elgort and Dakota Fanning with Best Original Song
 Sacha Baron Cohen introduced Jojo Rabbit
 Zoë Kravitz and Jason Momoa with Best Supporting Actress – Series, Miniseries or Television Film and Best Actress – Television Series Drama
 Charlize Theron with the Cecil B. DeMille Award
 Antonio Banderas and Helen Mirren with Best Director
 Cate Blanchett introduced Joker
 Tiffany Haddish and Salma Hayek with Best Actress – Miniseries or Television Film and Best Miniseries or Television Film
 Da'Vine Joy Randolph and Wesley Snipes introduced Dolemite Is My Name
 Jennifer Lopez and Paul Rudd with Best Original Score and Best Supporting Actor – Motion Picture
 Chris Evans and Scarlett Johansson with Best Actor – Motion Picture Musical or Comedy and Best Actress – Motion Picture Musical or Comedy
 Jason Bateman and Naomi Watts introduced Marriage Story
 Rachel Weisz introduced The Two Popes
 Pierce Brosnan and Will Ferrell with Best Motion Picture – Musical or Comedy
 Glenn Close with Best Actor – Motion Picture Drama
 Rami Malek with Best Actress – Motion Picture Drama
 Sandra Bullock with Best Motion Picture – Drama

Controversy

Controversy arose following Ricky Gervais's opening monologue, which was seen as an attack on the perceived hypocrisy of Hollywood. He joked about several controversial topics, such as the death of Jeffrey Epstein, the college admissions scandal, and the middle-aged Leonardo DiCaprio's attraction to younger women. Gervais also jokingly accused the Hollywood Foreign Press of racism for its lack of diversity in the "in memoriam" section, mocked Amazon, Apple and Disney for their labor practices, and chastised awardees who talk about their political views in acceptance speeches.

Gervais's comments attained mixed reactions across the political spectrum; while conservatives highly praised Gervais, journalists from liberal outlets were more critical, with Rolling Stone Rob Sheffield calling his monologue "incredibly stale". Of the criticism, Gervais said it was the "best ever", and later defended his jokes in a tweet.

See also
 92nd Academy Awards
 47th Annie Awards
 25th Critics' Choice Awards
 73rd British Academy Film Awards
 40th Golden Raspberry Awards
 23rd Hollywood Film Awards
 35th Independent Spirit Awards
 24th Satellite Awards
 26th Screen Actors Guild Awards

References

External links
 
 
 

Golden Globe
Golden Globe
077
2020 in California
Golden Globe
January 2020 events in the United States